Yves Lambert (4 June 1936 – 27 March 2021) was a French aerospace engineer. He was Director General of Eurocontrol from 1994 to 2000.

Biography

A graduate of the École Polytechnique (1956) and the École nationale de l'aviation civile (French civil aviation University, promotion 1959), Lambert started his career as head of the technical department of the civil aviation in Algeria (1961). After that, he became director of the air safety organization Organisation de gestion et de sécurité in Algeria (1965–1968).

In 1972, he was nominated to be the French representative at the International Civil Aviation Organization. He became Secretary General of ICAO in 1976, a position he held until 1988. He returned to France to be air navigation director of Direction de la navigation aérienne now called Direction des Services de la navigation aérienne until 1993.

In 1994, he was nominated Director General of Eurocontrol, a position he held until his retirement in 2000.

Yves Lambert is member of the Académie de l'air et de l'espace and the Royal Aeronautical Society.

Awards
 Officier of the Legion of Honour
 Commandeur of the Ordre national du Mérite
 Médaille de l'Aéronautique

Bibliography
 Académie nationale de l'air et de l'espace and Lucien Robineau, Les français du ciel, dictionnaire historique, Le Cherche midi, June 2005, 782 p., p. 304, LAMBERT, Yves

References

French aerospace engineers
École Polytechnique alumni
École nationale de l'aviation civile alumni
Corps de l'aviation civile
Corps des ponts
École nationale d'administration alumni
1936 births
Living people
Aviation in France
Officiers of the Légion d'honneur
Commanders of the Ordre national du Mérite
Recipients of the Aeronautical Medal
International Civil Aviation Organization people
French officials of the United Nations